Tai Le may refer to:

 Tai Le script
 Tai Nüa language / Tai Le language
 Tai Le (Unicode block), a block of Unicode characters for the Tai Le script.

See also
Tai Lü (disambiguation)